"The Way (Put Your Hand in My Hand)" is a single released by British music group Divine Inspiration on 6 January 2003. It reached number five on the UK Singles Chart and number 34 on the Irish Singles Chart in January 2003. It also found minor success in Germany and the Netherlands.

Charts

Weekly charts

Year-end charts

References

2002 songs
2003 debut singles
Data Records singles